Echinoscelis is a genus of moths in the family Cosmopterigidae.

Species
Echinoscelis hemithia Meyrick, 1886
Echinoscelis pandani (Turner, 1923)

References

Natural History Museum Lepidoptera genus database

Cosmopteriginae